Cerosterna fasciculata is a species of beetle in the family Cerambycidae. It was described by Per Olof Christopher Aurivillius in 1924 and is known from Sumatra.

References

Lamiini
Beetles described in 1924